In early Drosophila development, the first 13 cells pass through mitosis are nuclear divisions (karyokinesis) without cytokinesis, resulting in a multinucleate cell (generally referred to as a syncytium, but strictly a coenocyte). Pole cells are the cells that form at the polar ends of the Drosophila egg, which begin the adult germ cells. Pole plasm functions to bud the development of pole cells, as well as restore fertilization, even when the cell was previously sterile.

Formation 
During early development of the Drosophila development, pole plasm assembles at the posterior pole of the Drosophila embryo, allowing determination of the abdominal patterning. Late in oogenesis, polar organelles, which are electro-negative granules, are in the pole plasm. When the pole plasm further matures, it continues to consist of polar granules into the development of germ cells, which develop into adult germ cells. Serine protease activity occurs less than 2 hours after the budding of the pole cells from the pole plasm, and ending just prior to the movement of the pole cells via gastrulation. The patterning of the pole cells are determined by the activation of oskar, which acts in the determination of body patterning segments. Pole cells begin their migration in a cluster in the midgut primordium. To reach their final destination, pole cells must migrate through the epithelial wall. It is known that the cells migrate through the epithelial wall, but little is known about the mechanisms used to do so.

References

Mitosis